Rubus linkianus is a European species of brambles in the rose family. It is cultivated for its fruits and as an ornamental. It is occasionally naturalized in scattered locations in the United States.

The genetics of Rubus is extremely complex, so that it is difficult to decide on which groups should be recognized as species. There are many rare species with limited ranges such as this. Further study is suggested to clarify the taxonomy.

References

External links
 

linkianus
Plants described in 1822
Flora of Europe